
Gmina Kock is an urban-rural gmina (administrative district) in Lubartów County, Lublin Voivodeship, in eastern Poland.

As of 2006 its total population is 6,763, out of which the population of Kock is 3,478 and the population of the rural part of the gmina is 3,285.

Villages
Apart from the town of Kock, Gmina Kock contains the villages and settlements of Annopol, Annówka, Białobrzegi, Białobrzegi-Kolonia, Bożniewice, Górka, Lipniak, Poizdów, Poizdów-Kolonia, Ruska Wieś, Talczyn, Talczyn-Kolonia, Wygnanka and Zakalew.

Neighbouring gminas
Gmina Kock is bordered by the gminas of Borki, Firlej, Jeziorzany, Michów, Ostrówek and Serokomla.

References

Polish official population figures 2006

Kock
Lubartów County